Djúpalónssandur is a sandy beach and bay on foot of Snæfellsjökull in Iceland. It was once home to sixty fishing boats and one of the most prolific fishing villages on the Snæfellsnes peninsula but today the bay is uninhabited.

Four lifting stones are in Djúpalónssandur, used by fishermen to test their strength. They are Fullsterkur  ("full strength") weighing 154 kg, Hálfsterkur  ("half strength") at 100 kg, Hálfdrættingur  ("weakling") at 54 kg and Amlóði  ("Useless") 23 kg. They were traditionally used to qualify men for work on fishing boats, with the Hálfdrættingur being the minimum weight a man would have to lift onto a ledge at hip-height to qualify.

On the beach there are remains of the Grimsby fishing trawler Epine (GY7) that was wrecked there on March 13, 1948.

Notes

Snæfellsnes Volcanic Belt
Snæfellsnes
Tourist attractions in Iceland